Dead River may refer to:

United States

Florida
Dead River (Lake County, Florida)
Dead River, tributary of the Choctawhatchee River
Dead River, tributary of the Hillsborough River (Florida)
Dead River, tributary of the Kissimmee River
Dead River, tributary of the Ochlockonee River

Maine
 Dead River (Androscoggin River)
 Dead River (Kennebec River)
 Dead River (Narramissic River)
 Dead River (Sabattus River)
 Dead River (Saint George River)

Minnesota
 Dead River (Burntside River)
 Dead River (Otter Tail River)

Other states
 Dead River (Michigan)
 Dead River (New Hampshire)
 Dead River (New Jersey)
 Dead River (Oregon)

England 
 Dead River (River Mole), tributary of the River Mole

See also
The Dead River, Jakov Xoxa's novel
Dead River (film), a 2012 Namibian film
Campbells Dead River, in Santa Rosa County, Florida
Dead River Marsh, in Lake Griffin State Park
Hontoon Dead River, tributary of the St. Johns River
Jernigan Dead River, in Escambia County, Florida
Norris Dead River, tributary of the St. Johns River
River of the dead (disambiguation)